Steve Soboroff (born August 31, 1948) is an American businessman, philanthropist, and politician, who has been serving as a Los Angeles Police Commissioner since August 2013.  Soboroff previously served as President of the Los Angeles Recreation and Parks Commission between 1995 and 2000. After serving on the L.A. Harbor Commission and as Senior Advisor to Los Angeles Mayor Richard Riordan, Soboroff ran for Mayor of Los Angeles in the 2001 election and placed third.

An active philanthropist, Soboroff was the Chairman and CEO of Playa Vista. He served on the Board of the Weingart Foundation for 22 years, seven of which he was Chairman.  In September 2011 he was appointed by the California Science Center to be the Senior Advisor to the museum in its project with NASA to bring, and permanently exhibit, the Space Shuttle Endeavour. He is Chairman of the Maccabiah Games Committee of 18. Soboroff was Chairman of the Center for the Study of Los Angeles at Loyola Marymount University, and was a Senior Fellow and member of the Advisory Board at UCLA's Luskin School of Public Affairs.

Early life and education 
Soboroff was raised in a middle-class, secular Jewish family in Chicago, the son of Evelyn and Irving Soboroff. His father's hat manufacturing business declined in the 1960s when hats went out of fashion and the family moved first to Arkansas and then to California where his folks opened the successful Shaxted linen boutique in Beverly Hills. In 1966, Soboroff graduated from Taft High School in Woodland Hills, Los Angeles. He  tried to enlist during the Vietnam War but was denied for medical reasons. He holds Bachelor and Master's Degrees from the Dept. of Finance, Insurance and Real Estate at the University of Arizona. During the summers while in college, he worked as a chauffeur/kid watcher/assistant for Kirk Douglas, whose wife Anne was a frequent customer to his parents' retail linen shop called Shaxted

Career 
While in college, Soboroff's father had introduced him to J. K. Eichenbaum, a Los Angeles-based real estate developer who specialized in shopping centers. In 1971, Soboroff went to work for Eichenbaum, and in 1979, he left the company and using his network of contacts began to lease and renovate shopping centers on his own. In 1994, Los Angeles Mayor Richard Riordan appointed him as president of the Recreation and Parks Commission.

STAPLES Center 
Soboroff is widely credited as the driving force behind the development of STAPLES Center in downtown Los Angeles, having come up with a plan, as Senior Advisor to Mayor Riordan, to bring the Los Angeles Lakers and Los Angeles Kings and the Los Angeles Clippers to the heart of downtown Los Angeles.

2001 Los Angeles mayoral election 

Soboroff entered the 2001 mayoral primary election, and received Riordan's endorsement. As the only prominent Republican in the race, Soboroff placed third, coming within 3% of eventual winner James K. Hahn. Hahn and former California State Assembly Speaker Antonio Villaraigosa advanced to the runoff.

In 2005, many of the traffic-fighting proposals Soboroff introduced during his 2001 campaign, as well as his plan to break up the Los Angeles Unified School District (LAUSD), were reintroduced by other candidates in that year's mayoral contest. Later in 2005, newly elected Los Angeles Mayor Antonio Villaraigosa, with whom Soboroff competed for the Mayor's job in 2001, implemented Soboroff's proposal to ban all road construction during rush hour. Villaraigosa's 2005 and 2009 campaign manager, Ace Smith, played the same role for Soboroff in 2001.

Playa Vista 
In October 2001, Soboroff joined Playa Vista as the communities president. He oversaw the development of 20 parks, an elementary school, offices, the Los Angeles Clippers Training Center, residences, and other amenities, which resulted in one of the most popular neighborhoods in Los Angeles. The wetlands were preserved and major traffic mitigation improvements were established.

Los Angeles Dodgers 
On April 19, 2011, Soboroff was hired to be the Vice Chairman of the Los Angeles Dodgers baseball team. His responsibilities were said to include leading the efforts to improve the fan experience and strengthening the team's ties to the community.

One day later, Major League Baseball seized control of the Dodgers from owner Frank McCourt. He resigned his position on June 25, 2011, citing the "unanticipated action by the commissioner of Major League Baseball" as preventing him from doing the job for which he had been hired.

Personal life 
In 1982, he married Patti Schertzer. They have five children: Jacob (1983), Miles (1985), Molly (1987), Hannah (1988), and Leah (1993).

Soboroff is widely known as the foremost collector of typewriters that were previously owned by famous individuals.

Soboroff joined Big Brothers while a college student and was matched with then 9 year old Terry Alan Williams as his Little Brother. In 2022 the pair celebrated their 54th year as a match. Both Steve and Terry are now grandfathers.

References

External links
UCLA Library Online Campaign Literature Archive: Steve Soboroff for Mayor of Los Angeles
 CNN.com - L.A. voters pick new mayor in heated election - April 10, 2001

1948 births
Living people
20th-century American Jews
University of Arizona alumni
American real estate businesspeople
California Republicans
Harvard Business School people
Loyola Marymount University
University of California, Los Angeles fellows
Los Angeles Dodgers executives
Commissioners of the Los Angeles Police Department
21st-century American Jews
Candidates in the 2001 United States elections